Sima Xin (died 204 BC) was a military general of the Qin dynasty. He surrendered to Xiang Yu after the Battle of Julu in 207 BC. In 206 BC, following the collapse of the Qin dynasty, he was conferred the title of "King of Sai" by Xiang Yu and given part of the lands in Guanzhong as his fief when the latter split the former Qin Empire into the Eighteen Kingdoms.

Life
In 209 BC, Chen Sheng and Wu Guang started the Dazexiang Uprising to overthrow the Qin Dynasty. The Qin emperor, Qin Er Shi, placed Zhang Han in command of the imperial army, with Sima Xin and Dong Yi serving as his deputies, to quell the rebels.

In 207 BC, Zhang Han attacked the insurgent Zhao kingdom and besieged Zhao forces at Julu. Xiang Yu of the Chu kingdom came to Zhao's aid and defeated the Qin army at the Battle of Julu, despite having a smaller force. Zhang Han sent Sima Xin to the capital Xianyang to request for reinforcements. However, the eunuch Zhao Gao deceived Qin Er Shi and the emperor refused to send aid. Sima Xin escaped from Zhao Gao's assassins along the return journey and reported to Zhang Han that the state power of Qin had fallen into the hands of the eunuch. Zhang Han pondered over the situation and realised that even if he defeated the rebels, Zhao Gao would later frame him for treason and have him executed. Hence, he surrendered to Xiang Yu.

After the fall of the Qin Dynasty in 206 BC, Xiang Yu divided the former Qin Empire into the Eighteen Kingdoms and granted the land of Guanzhong (heartland of Qin) to the three surrendered Qin generals (the three fiefs were collectively known as the Three Qins). Sima Xin was given part of Guanzhong as his fief and received the title "King of Sai" (塞王). Later that year, Liu Bang (King of Han) attacked the Three Qins and defeated Zhang Han. Sima Xin and Dong Yi surrendered to Liu Bang.

In 205 BC, during the Chu–Han Contention, Liu Bang was defeated by Xiang Yu at the Battle of Pengcheng. Sima Xin and Dong Yi defected to Xiang Yu's side. The following year, Liu Bang attacked Xiang Yu at the Battle of Chenggao. Liu Bang lured Cao Jiu (曹咎), the defending general, to pursue and attack him. The Chu army fell into an ambush at the Si River and was defeated by Liu Bang's forces. Cao Jiu, Dong Yi and Sima Xin committed suicide.

The Book of Han says that, after his death, Liu Bang had Sima Xin's head suspended on a pole in the marketplace of Yueyang (in present-day Yanliang District, Xi'an, Shaanxi), his previous capital, because the latter had traitorously gone over to Xiang Yu after surrendering to Liu Bang in September 206.

Notes

References
 Sima Qian. Records of the Grand Historian, volumes 7, 8.
 Ban Gu et al. Book of Han, volumes 1, 31.
 Dubs, Homer H. (1938): The History of the Former Han Dynasty by Pan Ku, Vol. I. Baltimore, Waverly Press.

Qin dynasty generals
Chu–Han contention people
Chinese nobility
204 BC deaths
Chinese military personnel who committed suicide
Year of birth unknown
Suicides in the Chu–Han contention